Tansarga is a department or commune of Tapoa Province in eastern Burkina Faso. Its capital is the town of Tansarga.

Towns and villages

References

Departments of Burkina Faso
Tapoa Province